The 1927–28 Challenge Cup was the 28th staging of rugby league's oldest knockout competition, the Challenge Cup.

First round

In the single first round replay Halifax beat Hunslet 16–2 on 15 February.

Second round

In the two replays Huddersfield beat Dewsbury 16–8 on 29 February and Hull FC beat 16–0 on 1 March.

Third round

Having played out a scoreless game Batley and Hull FC repeated the score in a replay on 20 March and the tie went to a second replay which Hull won 6–2 on neutral territory, Headingley, on 26 March.

Semi-finals

Final
Swinton beat Warrington 5–3 in the final played at Central Park, Wigan on Saturday 14 April 1928. The game generated receipts of £3159 1s 11d and the attendance of 33,909 set a new record for a game at Central Park.

This was Swinton's third Challenge Cup Final win from four Final appearances and completed a League and Cup double for the club.

References

Challenge Cup
Challenge Cup